The 2008 Stan James World Matchplay was the 15th annual staging of the World Matchplay darts tournament by the Professional Darts Corporation. The tournament took place at the Winter Gardens, Blackpool, from 20–26 July 2008.

World number three James Wade went into the competition as the defending champion and managed to reach the final for the third year in a row, but was defeated by top seed Phil Taylor 18–9 who won his ninth World Matchplay championship.

Prize fund
A total of £300,000 was available for the players, divided based on the following performances:

Qualification
The qualification process for the World Matchplay differed this year. The top 16 in the PDC Order of the Merit after the 2008 UK Open qualified automatically as the 16 seeds. The other 16 places would be made up of the 16 highest ranked players (not already in the top 16) from the 2008 Players Championship Order of Merit - decided by the various Player Championship events taking place on the PDC Pro Tour from January 2008 - the cutoff point was the Las Vegas Players Championship just before the 2008 Las Vegas Desert Classic.

Thus, the participants were:

PDC Top 16
  Phil Taylor (winner)
  Raymond van Barneveld (quarter-finals)
  James Wade (runner-up)
  John Part (second round)
  Terry Jenkins (second round)
  Roland Scholten (first round)
  Andy Hamilton (first round)
  Adrian Lewis (first round)
  Colin Lloyd (first round)
  Wayne Mardle (semi-finals)
  Peter Manley (second round)
  Dennis Priestley (semi-finals)
  Alan Tabern (quarter-finals)
  Ronnie Baxter (second round)
  Kevin Painter (first round)
  Colin Osborne (second round)

PDPA Players Championship qualifiers
  Mervyn King (first round)
  Chris Mason (first round)
  Vincent van der Voort (first round)
  Denis Ovens (first round)
  Wayne Jones (first round)
  Mark Dudbridge (first round)
  Andy Smith (first round)
  Kevin McDine (quarter-finals)
  Mark Walsh (second round)
  Matt Clark (quarter-finals)
  Steve Beaton (first round)
  Michael van Gerwen (second round)
  Tony Eccles (second round)
  Alex Roy (first round)
  Mark Frost (first round)
  Adrian Gray (first round)

Draw

Statistics

References

World Matchplay (darts)
World Matchplay Darts